Deborah Cottrill (born 1963) is a British former competitive figure skater. She is a two-time British national champion (1972, 1982). Her best international results were fourth at the 1981 World Championships in Hartford, Connecticut and fourth at the 1982 European Championships in Lyon. Originally from Solihull, England, she later moved to Canada with her husband and became a coach in North Bay, Ontario.

Competitive highlights

References 

British female single skaters
Living people
British emigrants to Canada
Sportspeople from Solihull
1963 births